Bratton Township is a township in Mifflin County, Pennsylvania, United States. The population was 1,196 at the 2020 census.

Geography

Demographics

As of the census of 2000, there were 1,259 people, 482 households, and 369 families residing in the township.  The population density was 38.4 people per square mile (14.8/km2).  There were 605 housing units at an average density of 18.4/sq mi (7.1/km2).  The racial makeup of the township was 99.52% White, 0.08% Asian, 0.08% from other races, and 0.32% from two or more races. Hispanic or Latino of any race were 0.08% of the population.

There were 482 households, out of which 31.1% had children under the age of 18 living with them, 67.4% were married couples living together, 6.0% had a female householder with no husband present, and 23.4% were non-families. 20.5% of all households were made up of individuals, and 11.8% had someone living alone who was 65 years of age or older.  The average household size was 2.61 and the average family size was 3.00.

In the township the population was spread out, with 23.7% under the age of 18, 6.4% from 18 to 24, 27.6% from 25 to 44, 25.1% from 45 to 64, and 17.2% who were 65 years of age or older.  The median age was 39 years. For every 100 females, there were 101.8 males.  For every 100 females age 18 and over, there were 98.1 males.

The median income for a household in the township was $32,407, and the median income for a family was $36,810. Males had a median income of $29,706 versus $19,375 for females. The per capita income for the township was $14,516.  About 6.5% of families and 10.3% of the population were below the poverty line, including 13.2% of those under age 18 and 15.7% of those age 65 or over.

References

Populated places established in 1766
Townships in Mifflin County, Pennsylvania
Townships in Pennsylvania